Miguel da Paz, Hereditary Prince of Portugal and Prince of Asturias ("Michael of Peace") (23 August 1498 – 19 July 1500) was a Portuguese royal prince, son of King Manuel I of Portugal and his first wife, Isabella of Aragon, Princess of Asturias (1470-1498).

Life and death
Miguel da Paz was born in Zaragoza, Spain on 23 August 1498. His mother, Isabella of Aragon, died within an hour of his birth. He was shortly sworn heir to the various Iberian crowns by the courts of Portugal, Castile and Aragon. For the next two years, he was the recognized heir of his father's kingdom of Portugal and of the kingdoms of Castile, León and Aragon, which he would inherit from his grandparents, Ferdinand II of Aragon and Isabella I of Castile. As such, he was styled Prince of Portugal, Prince of Asturias and Prince of Girona.

Miguel died in Granada on 19 July 1500, in his grandmother's arms. He was buried in the Capilla Real, in Granada.

In October 1500, Miguel's father married Maria of Aragon, who was also the younger sister of Miguel's mother. Maria gave birth to Manuel's eventual successor, John III and to several other children.

The hopes of Isabella I and Ferdinand II to unite all of the Iberian kingdoms vanished with Miguel's death. His aunt Joanna inherited Castile, León and Aragon, and it was her grandson Philip II who established a short-lived Iberian Union.

Ancestry

References

Bibliography 

 
 

People from Zaragoza
Portuguese infantes
Princes of Portugal
Princes of Asturias
Heirs apparent who never acceded
House of Aviz
1498 births
1500 deaths
15th-century Portuguese people
Burials at the Royal Chapel of Granada
Portuguese people of British descent
Portuguese people of French descent
Portuguese people of German descent
Portuguese people of Spanish descent
Spanish people of English descent
Spanish people of French descent
Spanish people of German descent
Spanish people of Portuguese descent
Sons of kings
Royalty and nobility who died as children

Non-inheriting heirs presumptive